Abu'l Abbas al-Hijazi, was a 12th-century Arab Muslim traveler, merchant and sailor and is known to have spent forty years in China. His seven sons whom he positioned in seven different commercial centers from his base in Yemen, enhanced his trading business by sending goods from foreign markets. He had lost 10 ships in the Indian Ocean but recovered his fortunes when his 11th ship safely arrived from China which carried porcelain and aloewood.

References

Geographers of the medieval Islamic world
Yemeni geographers
12th-century Arabs